Clavimyia is a genus of flies in the family Stratiomyidae.

Species
Clavimyia alticola Lindner, 1924

References

Stratiomyidae
Brachycera genera
Taxa named by Erwin Lindner
Diptera of South America